Kent E. Rogers is a former American football coach.  He was the head football coach at Bethel College in North Newton, Kansas, serving for 19 seasons, from 1979 to 1994, and compiling a record of 69–80–1.

Rogers attended Fairview High School in Fairview, Kansas and graduated from Kansas State Teachers College at Emporia—now Emporia State University—in 1968 with a degree in physicals education and mathematics. He began his coaching career that year at Rossville High School in Rossville, Kansas, where he was an assistant coach in football, basketball, and track. In 1969, he was hired as the head football coach at Nemaha Valley High School in Seneca, Kansas. Rogers led his teams at Nemaha Valley to a record of 40–17 in six seasons. In 1975, he moved on to Hesston High School Hesston, Kansas, guiding his teams to a mark of 20–17 in four seasons.

Rogers earned a master's degree from Wichita State University.

Honors
Rogers was selected to work with the Kansas Shrine Bowl all-star game as an assistant coach in 1974 and head coach of the East team in 1975.  In 2009, he was named to the Kansas Shrine Bowl Hall of Fame.

While at Bethel, Rogers was named the conference coach of the year six times and was president of the NAIA football coaches association in 1992 and 1993.  He was named All-District 10 coach of the year in 1984   In 2003, Bethel College named him to their Athletic Hall of Fame.

Head coaching record

College

References

Year of birth missing (living people)
Living people
Bethel Threshers football coaches
High school basketball coaches in Kansas
High school football coaches in Kansas
Emporia State University alumni
Wichita State University alumni
People from Brown County, Kansas
Coaches of American football from Kansas